The 1900 United States presidential election in Tennessee took place on November 6, 1900. All contemporary 45 states were part of the 1900 United States presidential election. Tennessee voters chose 12 electors to the Electoral College, which selected the president and vice president.

Background
For over a century after the Civil War, Tennessee’s white citizenry was divided according to partisan loyalties established in that war. Unionist regions covering almost all of East Tennessee, Kentucky Pennyroyal-allied Macon County, and the five West Tennessee Highland Rim counties of Carroll, Henderson, McNairy, Hardin and Wayne voted Republican – generally by landslide margins – as they saw the Democratic Party as the “war party” who had forced them into a war they did not wish to fight. Contrariwise, the rest of Middle and West Tennessee who had supported and driven the state’s secession was equally fiercely Democratic as it associated the Republicans with Reconstruction. After the state’s white landowning class re-established its rule in the early 1870s, blacks and Unionist whites combined to give a competitive political system for two decades, although in this era the Republicans could only capture statewide offices when the Democratic Party was divided on this issue of payment of state debt. 

White Democrats in West Tennessee were always aiming to eliminate black political influence, which they first attempted to do by election fraud in the middle 1880s and did so much more successfully at the end of that decade by instituting in counties with significant black populations a secret ballot that prevented illiterates voting, and a poll tax throughout the state, which cut turnout by at least a third in the 1890s. Although the poll tax was supposedly relaxed or paid by party officials in Unionist Republican areas, turnout would continue to decline seriously in later years, although overall presidential partisan percentages did not change substantially as the GOP attempted to attract Democrats who would benefit from tariffs.

For the 1900 presidential election, a rematch of the fiercely contested 1896 campaign, neither Republican William McKinley nor Democrat William Jennings Bryan campaigned in Tennessee, and by the fourth week of October the state was generally contested, as it had consistently gone since 1872, to the Democrats.

Vote
Bryan ultimately carried Tennessee by a margin of 8.08 percent, an increase of 2.32 percent on his 1896 margin over McKinley, a small change but a substantial one given the extremely deep partisan loyalties of white Tennesseeans. His increased margin reflected more complete black disenfranchisement and reduced suspicion of his free-silver policies in the major urban areas, which saw him carry normally Republican Knox County.

Results

Results by county

Notes

References

Tennessee
1900
1900 Tennessee elections